The Silent Treatment is an album by Mark Deutrom, which was released in 2001 through Tee Pee Records.

Track listing
 "Toshiro Mifune"
 "The Hobnail Paisley"
 "El Morocco"
 "One Thousand Delights"
 "Chihuahua"
 "Coffinmakers Complaint"
 "Fat Hamlet"
 "The Hottentot Venus"
 "Borehole"
 "Your Necklace"
 "Revelator"
 "A Catastrophe"
 "Honey Drop"
 "Gateau D'amour"
 "Van Diemen's Land"
 "Candlelight and Wisteria"

Personnel
Mark Deutrom - Etcetera
John Evans - Drums

2001 albums
Mark Deutrom albums
Tee Pee Records albums